Kanal 1 or K1 is the first Bosnian cable music channel based in Sarajevo. This channel mainly broadcasts the latest music videos of domestic and foreign rock, pop and hip hop artists. The program is produced in Bosnian language. Kanal 1 is available via cable systems and IPTV platforms throughout the Bosnia and Herzegovina.

Kanal 1 Line-up
Daily program scheme on Kanal 1 consists of several music playlists, talk shows, European films and series.

TV shows
 Sudo Show – talk show about various topics from everyday life and society hosted by "Director Sudo" and "mysterious Sarajevo stars"
 Ministarstvo Kulture – (Ministry of Culture) the show hosted by renowned Bosnian artist Damir Nikšić, dedicated to the promotion of cultural and artistic achievements
 Izvan Svake Kontrole or ISK – (Outside any control) The show which was conceived as an "online presentation" eponymous radio show that is broadcast on Radio 202 (former part of RTVFBiH public service). An integral part of TV shows and makes web portal (ISK Webzine) where you can read reviews, articles and many other interesting activities from the world of rock and roll and film industry.
 Novi BH Zvuk or ISK – (The new BH Sound)"" – a music TV show dedicated to local musicians led by famous Bosnian musicians.
 Šortz – is a TV show that is intended for fans of experimental film art and offers short films of different genres.

Foreign series
 The Old Guys – British comedy television series produced by BBC Scotland
 Mad Dogs – British black comedy and psychological thriller television series produced by Left Bank Pictures, and co-produced by Palma Pictures
 luther – British psychological crime drama television series produced by BBC One
 Top Gear – British television show about motor vehicles, primarily cars etc.

References

External links 
 Kanal 1 TV official website
 Kanal 1 Sarajevo in Facebook
 Kanal 1 Sarajevo in YouTube
 Kanal 1 in Twitter
 ISK Show fan page in Facebook

Mass media in Sarajevo
Music organizations based in Bosnia and Herzegovina
Music television channels
Television stations in Bosnia and Herzegovina
Television channels and stations established in 2010